Luise Marie of the Palatinate (Luise Marie von der Plafz; 23 July 1647 – 11 March 1679) was a Palatine princess who married Charles Theodore, the Prince (Fürst) of Salm-Salm. A great-granddaughter of James I of England and niece of Sophia, Electress of Hanover, she and her family, as Catholics, were excluded from the line of succession to the British throne.

Early life
She was the eldest daughter of the landless Prince Palatine Edward and his French-Italian wife, Anna Gonzaga. She was probably named after her mother's sister, Ludwika Maria Gonzaga, Queen of Poland (in German, Louise Marie). Her younger sisters were Anne Henriette, wife of Henri Jules, Prince de Condé and Benedicta Henrietta, wife of John Frederick, Duke of Brunswick-Lüneburg. On her father's side, she was a first cousin of George I of Great Britain and Elisabeth Charlotte, Duchess of Orléans.

Marriage
On March 20, 1671, she married Charles Theodore, Prince of Salm. They had four children: 
 Princess Louise Apollonia of Salm, born 23 February 1672; died on 22 May 1678 at the age of 6. 
 Louis Otto, Prince of Salm, born on 24 October 1674. 
 Princess Louise-Apollonia of Salm (1677–1678)
 Princess Eleonore Christine of Salm, was born on March 14, 1678; married Conrad Albert, first Duke of Ursel, with whom she had issue; and died March 23, 1737, at the age of 59.

Ancestry

Notes and references

1647 births
1679 deaths
Louise
Luise Marie
Luise Marie
17th-century German women
17th-century German people